Erik Hanses (born June 1, 1990) is a Swedish professional ice hockey goaltender who plays with Modo Hockey of the HockeyAllsvenskan.

Following six seasons with Leksands IF, Hanses signed with Almtuna IS. On February 26, 2014, Hanses was transferred to Skellefteå AIK of the Swedish Hockey League (SHL).

References

External links

1990 births
Almtuna IS players
Living people
Modo Hockey players
People from Leksand Municipality
Skellefteå AIK players
Swedish ice hockey goaltenders
Sportspeople from Dalarna County